The 1970 Campionati Internazionali di Sicilia, also known as the Palermo Open, was a men's tennis tournament played on outdoor clay courts in Palermo, Italy. It was the 22nd edition of the tournament and was held in April 1970. It was an independent event, i.e. not part of the 1970 Grand Prix or World Championship Tennis circuits. István Gulyás won the singles title.

Finals

Singles
 István Gulyás defeated  Ilie Năstase 6–1, 6–4, 6–4

Doubles
 Ilie Năstase /  Ion Țiriac defeated  John Clifton /  David Lloyd 17–15, 11–9, 6–1

References

Campionati Internazionali di Sicilia
Campionati Internazionali di Sicilia